Pepsis is a genus of spider wasps belonging to the family Pompilidae.

Species within this genus are also called tarantula hawks, as they usually hunt tarantulas, similarly to many species in the genus Hemipepsis.

These wasps are restricted to the Americas, with the related genus Hemipepsis occurring in both Old and New Worlds.

Species
Species within this genus include:

Pepsis achterbergi Vardy, 2005
Pepsis aciculata Taschenberg, 1869
Pepsis adonta Vardy, 2005
Pepsis albocincta Smith, 1855
Pepsis amyntas Mocsáry, 1885
Pepsis apicata Taschenberg, 1869
Pepsis aquila H. Lucas, 1895
Pepsis assimilis Banks, 1946
Pepsis asteria Mocsáry, 1894
Pepsis atalanta Mocsáry, 1885
Pepsis atripennis Fabricius, 1793, 1804
Pepsis aurifex Smith, 1855
Pepsis auriguttata Burmeister, 1872
Pepsis aurozonata Smith, 1855
Pepsis australis Saussure, 1868
Pepsis basalis Mocsáry, 1885
Pepsis basifusca H. Lucas, 1895
Pepsis boharti Vardy, 2005
Pepsis bonplandi Brèthes, 1914
Pepsis brevicornis Mocsáry, 1894
Pepsis brunneicornis H. Lucas, 1895
Pepsis caliente Vardy, 2005
Pepsis caridei Brèthes, 1908
Pepsis cassiope Mocsáry, 1888
Pepsis catarinensis Vardy, 2005
Pepsis chacoana Brèthes, 1908
Pepsis chiliensis Lepeletier, 1845
Pepsis chiron Mocsáry, 1885
Pepsis chrysoptera Burmeister, 1872
Pepsis chrysothemis H. Lucas, 1895
Pepsis cincta (Fabricius, 1793, 1793)
Pepsis cofanes Banks, 1946
Pepsis completa Smith, 1855
Pepsis convexa H. Lucas, 1895
Pepsis cooperi Vardy, 2000
Pepsis crassicornis Mocsáry, 1885
Pepsis cyanescens Lepeletier, 1845
Pepsis cybele Banks, 1945
Pepsis dayi Vardy, 2005
Pepsis deaurata Mocsáry, 1894
Pepsis decipiens H. Lucas, 1895
Pepsis decorata Perty, 1833
Pepsis defecta Taschenberg, 1869
Pepsis dimidiata Fabricius, 1793, 1804
Pepsis discolor Taschenberg, 1869
Pepsis ecuadorae Vardy, 2002
Pepsis egregia Mocsáry, 1885Pepsis elevata Fabricius, 1793, 1804Pepsis elongata Lepeletier, 1845Pepsis equestris Erischson, 1848Pepsis esmeralda Vardy, 2005Pepsis festiva Fabricius, 1793, 1804Pepsis filiola Brèthes, 1914Pepsis flavescens H. Lucas, 1895Pepsis flavipennis (Fabricius, 1793, 1793)Pepsis foxi H. Lucas, 1897Pepsis friburgensis Vardy, 2002Pepsis frivaldszkyi Mocsáry, 1885Pepsis fumipennis Smith, 1855Pepsis gracilis Lepeletier, 1845Pepsis gracillima Taschenberg, 1869Pepsis grossa (Fabricius, 1793, 1798)Pepsis helvolicornis H. Lucas, 1895Pepsis heros (Fabricius, 1793, 1798)Pepsis hirtiventris Banks, 1946Pepsis hyalinipennis Mocsáry, 1885Pepsis hymenaea Mocsáry, 1885Pepsis hyperion Mocsáry, 1894Pepsis ianthina Erichson, 1848Pepsis ianthoides Vardy, 2005Pepsis inbio Vardy, 2000Pepsis inclyta Lepeletier, 1845Pepsis infuscata Spinola, 1841Pepsis jamaicensis Vardy, 2005Pepsis krombeini Vardy, 2005Pepsis laetabilis Brèthes, 1908Pepsis lampas H. Lucas, 1895Pepsis lepida Mocsáry, 1894Pepsis limbata Guerin, 1831Pepsis luteicornis Fabricius, 1793, 1804Pepsis lycaon Banks, 1945Pepsis maeandrina H. Lucas, 1895Pepsis marginata Palisot de Beauvois, 1809Pepsis marthae Vardy, 2002Pepsis martini Vardy, 2005Pepsis menechma Lepeletier, 1845Pepsis mexicana H. Lucas, 1895Pepsis mildei Stål, 1857Pepsis minarum Brèthes, 1914Pepsis montezuma Smith, 1855Pepsis multichroma Vardy, 2005Pepsis nana Mocsáry, 1885Pepsis nanoides Vardy, 2005Pepsis nigricans H. Lucas, 1895Pepsis nitida Lepeletier, 1845Pepsis onorei Vardy, 2002Pepsis optima Smith, 1879Pepsis optimatis Smith, 1873Pepsis pallidolimbata H. Lucas, 1895Pepsis petitii Guerin, 1831Pepsis pilosa Banks, 1946Pepsis plutus Erichson, 1848Pepsis pretiosa Dahlbom, 1843Pepsis pulawskii Vardy, 2002Pepsis pulszkyi Mocsáry, 1885Pepsis purpurea Smith, 1873Pepsis purpureipes Packard, 1869Pepsis riopretensis Vardy, 2002Pepsis roigi Vardy, 2000Pepsis rubra (Drury, 1773)Pepsis ruficornis (Fabricius, 1793, 1775)Pepsis sabina Mocsáry, 1885Pepsis schlinkei H. Lucas, 1897Pepsis seifferti H. Lucas, 1895Pepsis seladonica Dahlbom, 1843Pepsis sericans Lepeletier, 1845Pepsis smaragdina Dahlbom, 1843Pepsis sommeri Dahlbom, 1845Pepsis stella Montet, 1921Pepsis sumptuosa Smith, 1855Pepsis taschenbergi H. Lucas, 1895Pepsis terminata Dahlbom, 1843Pepsis thisbe H. Lucas, 1895Pepsis thoreyi Dahlbom, 1845Pepsis tolteca H. Lucas, 1895Pepsis toppini Turner, 1915Pepsis tricuspidata Gribodo, 1894Pepsis varipennis Lepeletier, 1845Pepsis vinipennis Packard, 1869Pepsis viridis Lepeletier, 1845Pepsis viridisetosa Spinola, 1841Pepsis vitripennis Smith, 1855Pepsis wahisi Vardy, 2005Pepsis xanthocera Dahlbom, 1843Pepsis yucatani Vardy, 2002

References

Bibliography
 Fred Punzo, Brian Garman. 1989. Effects of Encounter Experience on the hunting behavior of the spider wasp, Pepsis formosa'' (Say) (Hymenoptera: Pompilidae). In: The Southwestern Naturalist 34(4). December 1989, ISSN 0038-4909, S. 513–518.
 Harris, A. C. 1987. Pompilidae (Insecta: Hymenoptera). Fauna of New Zealand. DSIR Science Information Publishing Centre. 12:1-154.

External links

Hymenoptera genera
Pepsinae
Taxa named by Johan Christian Fabricius